m-Coumaric acid is a hydroxycinnamic acid, an organic compound that is a hydroxy derivative of cinnamic acid. There are three isomers of coumaric acid – o-coumaric acid, m-coumaric acid, and p-coumaric acid – that differ by the position of the hydroxy substitution of the phenyl group.

m-Coumaric acid can be found in vinegar.

References 

Hydroxycinnamic acids